is a passenger railway station in the city of Tōgane, Chiba Japan, operated by the East Japan Railway Company (JR East).

Lines

Station layout
The station consists of two opposed side platforms. One platform is directly adjacent to the old wooden station building, and was originally a semi-bay platform; the other is connected by a footbridge. The station is staffed.

Platform

History
Tōgane Station was opened on June 30, 1900 as a terminal station on the Bōsō Railway. The line was nationalized on September 1, 1907 and became part of the Japanese Government Railways (JGR). The terminal station was extended from Tōgane to Ōami on October 12, 1909 and in the opposite direction to Narutō by November 1, 1911. From November 25, 1926 to March 1, 1961, the station was also a terminal for the now-defunct Kujukuri Railway. The station was absorbed into the JR East network upon the privatization of the JNR on April 1, 1987.

Passenger statistics
In fiscal 2019, the station was used by an average of 4187 passengers daily (boarding passengers only).

Surrounding area
 Tōgane City Hall

See also
 List of railway stations in Japan

References

External links

 JR East Station information 

Railway stations in Japan opened in 1900
Railway stations in Chiba Prefecture
Tōgane Line
Tōgane